Two Fisted Justice is a 1924 American silent Western film directed by Dick Hatton and starring Hatton, Marilyn Mills and J. Morris Foster.

Cast
 Dick Hatton as Sheriff Rance Raine
 Marilyn Mills as Mort Landeau's Wife
 J. Morris Foster as Mort Landeau
 Arthur Morrison as Gang leader

References

Bibliography
 Pitts, Michael R. Western Movies: A Guide to 5,105 Feature Films. McFarland, 2012.

External links
 

1924 films
1924 Western (genre) films
American black-and-white films
Arrow Film Corporation films
Silent American Western (genre) films
1920s English-language films
1920s American films